The UCI World Cups are the World Cups for cycling disciplines organized by the Union Cycliste Internationale:

 UCI Road World Cup (1989–2004)
 UCI Women's Road World Cup (1998–2015)
 UCI Mountain Bike World Cup
 UCI Track Cycling World Cup
 UCI Cyclo-cross World Cup
 UCI BMX Supercross World Cup
 UCI Trials World Cup
 UCI Cycle-ball World Cup
 UCI Para-cycling Road World Cup

 
World Cups
Cycle racing series
World cups